Danièle Sicot-Coulon (born 24 March 1935) is a French gymnast. She competed at the 1956 Summer Olympics and the 1960 Summer Olympics.

References

External links
 

1935 births
Living people
French female artistic gymnasts
Olympic gymnasts of France
Gymnasts at the 1956 Summer Olympics
Gymnasts at the 1960 Summer Olympics
People from Châteaudun
Sportspeople from Eure-et-Loir
20th-century French women